The University of San Carlos Museum is the history museum of the University of San Carlos (USC), located in Cebu City, the Philippines.

History
The University of San Carlos Museum has been operating as early as 1952 but it was only on April 23, 1967, that inauguration rites for the museum was conducted which was graced by Verbite priest and then University of San Carlos President, Rudolf Rahmann and then First Lady Imelda Marcos. In 1967, the museum then occupied just two classrooms and another room. By 2017, it was occupying the ground floor wings of the Arthur Dingman Building along P. Del Rosario Street at USC's Downtown Campus

Collection
According to an inventory made in 1988 by then USC Museum curator Jane Calderon-Hayhow, the museum's collection comprises 9,606 artifacts, objects and specimens.

Literature

References

External links 
 Homepage

Museums in Cebu City
History museums in the Philippines
University of San Carlos
University museums in the Philippines
1950s establishments in the Philippines